The 1976–77 Michigan State Spartans men's basketball team represented Michigan State University in the 1976–77 NCAA Division I men's basketball season as members of the Big Ten Conference. They played their home games at Jenison Fieldhouse in East Lansing, Michigan and were coached by Jud Heathcote in his first year as head coach of the Spartans. MSU finished the season 10–17, 7–11 in Big Ten play to finish in fifth place.

Due to forfeits related to NCAA sanctions to Minnesota for improper selling of tickets, MSU's official record for the season is 12–15, 9–9.

Previous season 
The Spartans finished the 1975–76 season 14–13, 10–8 in Big Ten play to finish in fourth place. The season marked the last season for Gus Ganakas as Spartan head coach.

Roster and statistics 

Source

Schedule and results 

|-
!colspan=9 style=| Non-conference regular season

|-
!colspan=9 style=| Big Ten regular season

References 

Michigan State Spartans men's basketball seasons
Michigan State
Michigan State Spartans men's b
Michigan